Anywhere Advisors (formerly Realogy Brokerage Group, NRT, or National Realty Trust) is a residential real estate brokerage company in the United States of America. A subsidiary of Anywhere Real Estate, Inc. (formerly Realogy Holdings Corp.), its headquarters are located in Madison, New Jersey. As of 2022, the company owns and operates more than 40 brokerage firms in approximately 55 U.S. markets. Most firms are branded under the Coldwell Banker, Coldwell Banker Commercial, Sotheby's International Realty  or Corcoran Group brands.

History 
National Realty Trust was formed in 1996 when Cendant, (then HFS Inc.) purchased Coldwell Banker Corporation. The trust was responsible for the nearly 400 brokerage offices that had been acquired in the Coldwell Banker purchase as well as continuing to acquire offices and renaming them with one of Cendant's brand names (Coldwell Banker, ERA and Century 21).

In August 1997, Cendant and Apollo Management formed the current company – NRT LLC. The joint venture operation was established to allow greater acquisition growth.  Acquisitions were subsequently made in 1997 in Northern and Southern California as well as in Cincinnati, Ohio.

In 1998, NRT entered new markets in Atlanta, Baltimore, Boston, Denver, Minnesota and Washington, D.C. Significant additions to NRT's Florida and New Jersey holdings were also made.

The company continued to grow in 1999, entering Dallas/Fort Worth, Harrisburg and Milwaukee markets.  With these new holdings, NRT reached its 100th acquisition mark.

In 2000, NRT set a "real estate industry record, surpassing $100 billion in closed sales volume" and acquired Fred Sands Realtors, a $5 billion company based in Los Angeles.  By the end of the year, NRT had acquired over 150 companies.

NRT entered the Columbus, Ohio, New York City, and Utah markets in 2001 and continued to make acquisitions in St. Louis, Dallas/Fort Worth, Lake Tahoe, Denver, Atlanta, Sacramento and San Diego.

In 2002, Cendant acquired 100 percent of NRT's common stock and bought out Apollo Management.  It was a "$224 million stock deal in which Cendant paid the $166 million that NRT was slated to pay Apollo as part of the original joint venture agreement."  NRT incorporated itself within Cendant, operating within its Real Estate Services division. By the end of the year, it had acquired the largest independent real estate firms in Florida and the New England area.  NRT's corporate headquarters relocated from Mission Viejo, California, to the NRT Home Office in Parsippany, New Jersey.

References 

Real estate companies established in 1996
Real estate investment trusts of the United States
Real estate services companies of the United States
Investment management companies of the United States
Mortgage industry companies of the United States
Property management companies
Commercial real estate companies
Financial services companies based in California
Companies based in Orange County, California
Mission Viejo, California
Financial services companies based in New Jersey
Companies based in Morris County, New Jersey
Madison, New Jersey
Parsippany-Troy Hills, New Jersey
American companies established in 1996
Financial services companies established in 1996
1996 establishments in New Jersey
Realogy brands